Route 26 is a national route of Uruguay. It is one of the main Uruguayan routes covering the country from west to east, connecting Río Branco to other cities like Melo and Tacuarembó. Its "Kilometer Zero" (starting point), is at the route 3 junction.

This route covers a distance of 486 km (302 mi). It bears the name of the politician and civil war hero Leandro Gómez.

Destinations

These are the populated places Route 26 passes through.
Paysandú Department
km 0: Near Paysandú, on the Route 3 junction
Tacuarembó Department
km 203: Tacuarembó city, the capital of the Tacuarembó Department, on the Route 5 junction
km 252: Ansina near the Route 44 junction
km 312: Las Toscas 7 km away from the Route 6 junction
Cerro Largo Department
km 398: Melo
km 485: Río Branco. It later merges with José Hilario Uriarte road, then Avenida Centenario, and later the
Barão de Mauá International Bridge.

References

External links

Roads in Uruguay